The southern corroboree frog (Pseudophryne corroboree) is a species of Australian ground frog native to southeastern Australia.

The species was described in 1953 by Fulbright research scholar John A. Moore from a specimen collected at Towong Hill Station at Corryong, Victoria, and sent to the Australian Museum. The curator Roy Kinghorn recognised it as a new species and allowed Moore to describe it.

Description
The body and head are short and wide, the snout has a slight point, and the fingers and toes lack webbing. The iris is black. The northern corroboree frog has narrower and more greenish-yellow striping.

Habitat and conservation
The southern corroboree frog is native to Kosciuszko National Park in the northern Snowy Mountains, where it is found at locales between the Maragle Range and Smiggin Holes. Reported as abundant during the 1970s, it declined drastically during the 1980s from chytridiomycosis. The species is critically endangered, with the wild population thought to number around 30 individuals.

Efforts to conserve the species have included establishing captive breeding programs across four institutions: the Amphibian Research Centre in 1997, Melbourne Zoo in 2001, Taronga Zoo in 2006, and Healesville Sanctuary in 2007. By 2018, there were over 400 southern corroboree frogs in zoos.

Five breeding enclosures have been established in Kosciuszko National Park. Two-thirds of the frogs in these perished in the 2019–20 Australian bushfires. In 2022, a further 100 frogs were released from captive breeding programs.

References

Pseudophryne
Frogs of Australia
Amphibians of New South Wales
Endemic fauna of Australia
Amphibians described in 1953